Valdina (Sicilian: Vaddina) is a comune (municipality) in the Metropolitan City of Messina in the Italian region Sicily, located about  east of Palermo and about  west of Messina.

Valdina borders the following municipalities: Roccavaldina, Torregrotta, Venetico.

References

Cities and towns in Sicily